University of Chicago Library is the library system of the University of Chicago, located on the university's campus in Chicago, Illinois, United States. It is the tenth largest academic library in North America, with over 11.9 million volumes as of 2019. The library also holds 65,330 linear feet of archives and manuscripts and 245 terabytes of born-digital archives, digitized collections, and research data.

The library has borrowing privileges with several other archives, museums, and libraries in the Chicago area, including the Art Institute of Chicago Library, the Chicago History Museum, Fermilab, the Field Museum of Natural History, and the Newberry Library.

The library was founded by president of the University of Chicago, William Rainey Harper, who set the course for Special Collections as a “working collection” in 1891. The library's collections are located in six sites: the Joseph Regenstein Library, the John Crerar Library, the D'Angelo Law Library, the Joe and Rika Mansueto Library, the Eckhart Library for mathematics and computer science, and the School of Social Service Administration Library.

See also 
 University of Chicago

References

External links 
 The University of Chicago Library
 The University of Chicago Library at the Digital Library Federation
Guide to the University of Chicago Library Office of the Director, Ernest Dewitt Burton and J. C. M. Hanson, Records 1910-1928 at the University of Chicago Special Collections Research Center
Guide to the University of Chicago Library Office of the Director, M. Llewellyn Raney, Ralph A. Beals and Allen T. Hazen, Records 1894-1959 at the University of Chicago Special Collections Research Center
Guide to the University of Chicago Library Office of the Director, Zella Allen Dixson, Records 1892-1910 at the University of Chicago Special Collections Research Center 

 
University and college academic libraries in the United States
Libraries in Chicago